Isidro Pedraza Chávez (15 May 1959 – 10 November 2020) was a Mexican politician affiliated with the PRD.

Biography
He served as Senator of the LXII Legislature of the Mexican Congress representing Hidalgo. He also served as Deputy during the LX Legislature.

Pedraza Chávez died of COVID-19 in Pachuca, Hidalgo, on 10 November 2020, at the age of 61.

References

1959 births
2020 deaths
Deaths from the COVID-19 pandemic in Mexico
Politicians from Hidalgo (state)
Members of the Senate of the Republic (Mexico)
Members of the Chamber of Deputies (Mexico)
Party of the Democratic Revolution politicians
21st-century Mexican politicians
20th-century Mexican politicians
Members of the Congress of Hidalgo
Senators of the LXII and LXIII Legislatures of Mexico